(the Northern Lights Prize, established in 1989) is an annual award presented by the newspaper Nordlys during the opening concert at Nordlysfestivalen in Tromsø, Norway. Nordlysprisen is awarded to a performing musician or composer, that through their work in Northern Norway has excelled at a high artistic level and therefore contributed to highlighting the region's musical life in a positive way. In 2013 the prize-winner was awarded 50 000 Norwegian kroner.

Nordlysprisen winners 
1989: Håkon Stødle (clarinet), from Porsanger
1990: Paul Wåhlberg (flute), from Göteborg
1991: Tori Stødle (piano), from Oslo
1992: Tove Karoline Knutsen (vocals), from Torsken
1993: Arne Dagsvik (conductor and composer), from Åfjord
1994: Mari Boine (vocals), from Karasjok
1995: Bjørn Andor Drage (composer and concert organist), from Saltdal
1996: Bjarte Engeset (conductor), from Ørsta
1997: Arne Bjørhei (trumpet), from Troms
1998: Henning Gravrok (saxophone), from Tovik
1999: Geir Jensen (keyboards), from Tromsø
2000: Arvid Engegård (violin), from Bodø
2001: Malfred Hanssen (violin), from Bodø
2002: Knut Erik Sundquist (double bass), from Tromsø
2003: Ingor Ánte Áilo Gaup (joik and composer), from Kautokeino
2004: Ola Bremnes (troubadour), from Svolvær
2005: Susanne Lundeng (violin and fiddle), from Bodø
2006: Jan Gunnar Hoff (piano), from Bodø
2007: Anneli Drecker (vocals), from Tromsø
2008: Ragnar Rasmussen (conductor), from Vardø
2009: Marianne Beate Kielland (mezzo-soprano), from Lørenskog
2010: Bodvar Moe (double bass & composer), from Mo i Rana
2011: Marit Sandvik (vocals), from Harstad
2012: Inga Juuso (vocals), from Kautokeino
2013: Nils Anders Mortensen (piano), from Flekkefjord
2014: Anne-Lise Sollied Allemano (soprano), from Tromsø
2015: Ragnar Olsen, (folk singer, songwriter), from Tromsø
2016: Ketil Vea and Sigmund Lillebjerka
2017: Terje Nilsen
2018: Ragnhild Furebotten
2019: Roger Ludvigsen
2020: Jens Christian Kloster
2021: Ola Graff

References

External links 
Nordlysprisen at Nordlysfestivalen's official website

Culture in Troms
Norwegian music awards
Awards established in 1989